Stelian Carabaş (born 2 October 1974 in Medgidia) is a retired Romanian footballer who played as a midfielder, notably for Steaua Bucharest and Anorthosis Famagusta. His brother Costel was also a footballer who managed to win the Liga I title with Universitatea Craiova in the early 1990s.

He was capped once for Romania, against Cyprus in 2000.

Honours

Club
Steaua București
Liga I: 2000–01
Anorthosis Famagusta
Cypriot Cup: 2006–07

References

External links
 
 

1974 births
Living people
Romanian footballers
Romania international footballers
Romanian expatriate footballers
Liga I players
Süper Lig players
Super League Greece players
Cypriot First Division players
FCV Farul Constanța players
FC Progresul București players
FC Steaua București players
MKE Ankaragücü footballers
AEL Limassol players
Xanthi F.C. players
Anorthosis Famagusta F.C. players
Association football midfielders